SuperHappyDevHouse (a.k.a. SHDH) is an international series of social events that organizers originally conceived as parties for hackers and thinkers. It was founded by Jeff Lindsay and David Weekly (founder of PBwiki) on May 29, 2005. SHDH in Silicon Valley began by hosting 150 to 200 people every six weeks at rotating venues throughout San Francisco Bay and Silicon Valley, California. The unusual name derived from a popular 1991 Saturday Night Live satire, Happy Fun Ball, which lampooned TV commercials and the NERF Ball. Weekly lived in a house nicknamed "SuperHappyFunHouse" after SNL's commercial parody, and that name was given yet another twist as SuperHappyDevHouse.

Global expansion
By 2008, SHDH had expanded globally with CocoaDevHouse (London); SuperHappyDevClub (Cambridge, UK); Cologne DevHouse (Cologne, Germany); SuperHappyDevFlat (Zurich, Switzerland); SuperHappyHackerHouse (Vancouver, Canada); SuperHappyDevHouse Aotearoa (New Zealand); PhoenixDevHouse (Arizona); BostonDevHouse (Cambridge, Massachusetts); and DevHouse Pittsburgh (Pennsylvania). There was a DevHouse in Hermosillo, Mexico in September 2008, marking the first Latin American DevHouse, followed shortly thereafter by a Mexico City DevHouse on November 1, 2008, GuadalajaraDevHouse (Guadalajara, Mexico) on September 6, 2009, and two years later by a Dev House on Mérida, Mexico on February 28, 2010.

People, whether technical or creative, gather at a private home for not-so-serious productivity and socialization. Organizers say they're trying to "resurrect the spirit of the Homebrew Computer Club." It is a non-exclusive event intended for passionate and creative technical people that want to have some fun, learn new things, and meet new people. There is no admission charge; the event is paid for by donations and sponsorships.

The original SHDH was in Hillsborough, California and later in Los Gatos, California.

As of August 2009, SHDH spawned HackerDojo to operate a Hackerspace in Mountain View, CA to allow for 24/7 programming, hackathons, classes, workshops, and lectures. SHDH now operates as an activity of Hacker Dojo Corporation.

References

 Wired News commentary mentions DevHouse 10/25/06
 Mercury News Business Cover Article on SHDH, 6/17/07
 News.com coverage of SHDH19
 Boston Globe mention of DevHouse Boston, 8/11/07
 San Francisco Chronicle: 11 Things: SuperHappyDevHouse 10/2/08
 Fast Company: Does The Tech Industry's Obsessive Party Fetish Pay Off?

External links
 

Computer-related events
Recurring events established in 2005